Thy Kingdom Gone is a concept album and the sixth full-length album by the German gothic metal band Flowing Tears. The cover art was made by Seth Siro Anton, who has previously worked with bands such as Moonspell, Soilwork, and Paradise Lost.
The song "Thy Kingdom Gone" features male vocals of Vorph from Samael.

Track listing

Personnel 

Flowing Tears
Helen Vogt – vocals
Benjamin Buss – guitars, keyboards
David Vogt – bass
Stefan Gemballa – drums, percussion

Additional musicians
Vorph – vocals (track 5)
Sascha Blach – vocals (track 11)
Tom Diener – drums, percussion
David Buballa – keyboards

Technical personnel
Benjamin Buss – producer
David Buballa – producer, engineer
Kristian Kohlmannslehner – engineer, mixer
Johi – recording (vocals)

Other personnel
Seth Siro Anton – artwork, layout
Manuela Meyer – photography

References 

2008 albums
Flowing Tears albums
Concept albums
Albums with cover art by Spiros Antoniou